Zdeněk Šmejkal (born 21 June 1988) is a professional Czech football player.

He played for Czech youth national teams at under-19 and under-21 level.

References
 
 

Czech footballers
Czech Republic youth international footballers
Czech Republic under-21 international footballers
1988 births
Living people
FC Viktoria Plzeň players
FC Baník Ostrava players

Association football defenders